Roman Maksimovich Putilin (born 4 December 1990) is a Russian former professional football player.

Club career
He made his Russian Football National League debut for FC Torpedo Vladimir on 7 April 2012 in a game against FC KAMAZ Naberezhnye Chelny.

Personal
Putilin was born on December 4, 1990 in Vladimir, Russia. He is a son of Maksim Putilin.

External links
 

1990 births
People from Vladimir, Russia
Living people
Russian footballers
Association football defenders
FC Tekstilshchik Ivanovo players
FC Torpedo Vladimir players
Sportspeople from Vladimir Oblast